Berwick is an unincorporated community in Warren County, Illinois, United States. Berwick contains a fire department, post office, grain elevator, and Baptist Church. Berwick has a post office with ZIP code 61417.

Notable People

Calvin B. Hoover - noted American economist and Duke University professor. Founder of the field of comparative economic systems.

References

Unincorporated communities in Warren County, Illinois
Unincorporated communities in Illinois